Actinolema is a genus of plants in the family Apiaceae. They are found in Southwest Asia and the Caucasus.

Two species are recognised:
 Actinolema eryngioides 
 Actinolema macrolema

References 

Apioideae
Taxa named by Eduard Fenzl
Apioideae genera